Shooting competition has been in the Universiade in 2007, 2011, 2013 and 2015 as optional sport. Shooting will be an optional sport at the next 2 editions : in 2019 to be held in Naples, Italy and 2021, to be held in Chengdu, People's Republic of China.

Editions

Medal table 
Last updated after the 2019 Summer Universiade

References 
International Shooting Sport Federation
Naples 2019 Official Website